Tenacibaculum dicentrarchi is a Gram-negative and rod-shaped bacterium from the genus of Tenacibaculum which has been isolated from the European sea bass from Spain.

References

External links
Type strain of Tenacibaculum dicentrarchi at BacDive -  the Bacterial Diversity Metadatabase

Flavobacteria
Bacteria described in 2012